("into the wolf's mouth") is an Italian idiom originally used in opera and theatre to wish a performer good luck prior to a performance.

Equivalent to the English actor's idiom "break a leg", the expression reflects a theatrical superstition in which wishing a person "good luck" is considered bad luck. The expression is commonly used in Italy off stage, as superstitions and customs travel through other professions and then into common use, and it can sometimes be heard outside of Italy.

Origin
Its use originated with hunters wishing each other to be in dangerous situations. The superstitious use of wishing a negative or dangerous situation as a way of wishing good luck is common in other languages. Indeed, the general image of the wolf in the common language, both in Italy and in the Western culture, is that of a dangerous, hungry and violent creature (e.g. wolf in sheep's clothing, cry wolf).

Alternative idioms
An alternative operatic good luck charm is the phrase toi toi toi, originally an idiom used to ward off a spell or curse, often accompanied by knocking on wood, and onomatopoeic spitting (or imitating the sound of spitting). Amongst English actors break a leg is the usual phrase, while for professional dancers the traditional saying is merde, from French for "shit".

In popular culture
The American band Murder by Death has an album titled In Bocca al Lupo.

See also
 Spilling water for luck
 Bocca di Lupo (restaurant)

References

Opera terminology
Stage terminology
Superstitions

fr:In bocca al lupo
it:In bocca al lupo